The King Abdullah Petroleum Studies and Research Center (KAPSARC) is an advisory that consults different organizations in the Saudi energy sector, with a focus on global energy economics and sustainability. It is located in Riyadh, Saudi Arabia. 

In 2020 KAPSARC was ranked by the University of Pennsylvania Think Tank and Civil Societies Program as 13th place out of 60th in its list of global top Energy and Resource Policy think tanks. It was ranked 15th out of 103 in the MENA Think Tank index 2019.

History
KAPSARC was inaugurated by the Custodian of the Two Holy Mosques King Salman in 2016,  KAPSARC's activities are funded in perpetuity by an endowment provided by the Government of Saudi Arabia.

Governance
KAPSARC's Board of Trustees has controlling authority over the center's affairs, policies and governance. Chaired by the Minister of Energy (HRH Prince Abdilaziz Bin Salman Al-Saud), it comprises the president, three international members and three Saudi members. The center is supported by the International Advisory Council (IAC), a group of globally recognized energy thought leaders who advise the center on its ongoing projects.

The IAC meets once a year and consists of members of national, regional and international stature, such as Majid Al-Moneef, Turki Al-Saud, Jin-Yong Cai, Daniel Yergin, Sunita Narain, Richard Newell, Adnan Shihab-Eldin and others.

Campus 
The KAPSARC campus on the northern edge of Riyadh contains both a Residential Campus (called the REC, located on the west side) and a Research and Office Complex (called the ROC, on the east side). The 70,000 square meters Research and Office Complex was designed by Zaha Hadid, and supported by Event Communications. Hadid received the commission after a 2009 design competition. It opened in October 2017 and received a LEED Platinum certification. The complex consists of five interlocking buildings, a research center, a computer center, a conference center, a library and the Musalla, a place for prayer.

Research initiatives and publications
In 2019, KAPSARC created four energy-economics products . The products will provide insights and recommendations for energy security, diversify economic resources, and curb climate change. One of its flagship models is called the KAPSARC Energy Model (KEM). In 2019  the center's publications in 10 initiatives – including energy, economy, oil, electricity, transportation, and climate change – rose by 32.5% compared with 2018, from 86 to 114 studies.

The center introduced more than 1250 open access models and research tools to advance the understanding of energy economics and environment policy pathways.

Awards
Since KAPSARC's  inauguration, the center received five awards highlighting the architecture and engineering of the center:

 LEED Platinum Certified
 Global Best Project of the Year in the category of education and research buildings, presented by ENR Engineering News-Record
 World Architecture Community Award
 Described by New York Times® as Environmental Beauty and Efficiency
 Saudi Arabia's “Smartest Building” in the Honeywell® smart building award.

KAPSARC and G20
KAPSARC has been working alongside the Saudi G20 Secretariat on programs that are associated with the G20 Summit that will be hosted in Riyadh in 2020. The Think 20 (T20) Engagement Group provides research-based policy advice, facilitates interaction and communicates with the broader public on important issues related to the G20 nations that represent 85% of the world's economy and 75% of the global population. KAPSARC represented Saudi Arabia at the T20 summit in Buenos Aires in September 2018 and participated in the T20 inception meeting for 2019 that was held in Tokyo in December 2018.

KAPSARC and T20
KAPSARC  and the King Faisal Center for Research and Islamic Studies (KFCRIS) held the Think20 (T20) Inception Conference in Riyadh, Saudi Arabia on January 19–20, 2020

The T20 is an engagement group that contributes to the G20 by providing research-based policy recommendations to the G20. The T20 communiqué presents vital policy recommendations developed by T20 Saudi Arabia task forces for consideration by the Leaders of G20 member countries during their summit in Riyadh in November 2020. The Inception Conference convened more than 150 institutions and think tanks, and over 550 attendees from 65 countries, to discuss a range of essential issues covering climate and energy, women and youth, innovation and technology, multilateralism, economic development and finance, food security and access to water.

Partners
KAPSARC has the strength of its international ties with more than 24 research institutes, public policy organizations and government institutions worldwide. Its collaborations allow it to further enrich its research output. They include:

King Abdullah City for Atomic and Renewable Energy (KSA)
King Abdulaziz City for Science and Technology (KSA)
Kuwait Institute for Scientific Research
Ministry of Economy and Planning (KSA)
Saudi Arabian Monetary Agency (KSA)
Saudi Aramco (KSA)
Saudi Electricity Company (KSA)
Saudi Standards, Metrology and Quality Organization (KSA)
TERI University (India)
The Energy and Resources Institute (India)
World Bank
Arabian Gulf University (Bahrain)
Atlantic Council (United States)
Center for Strategic and International Studies (United States)
China National Petroleum Corporation – Institute of Economics and Technology
China Sustainable Transport Center
Derasat (Bahrain)
Electricity and Cogeneration Regulatory Authority (KSA)
Energy Research Institute of the NDRC (China)
Gulf Cooperation Council Interconnection Authority (KSA)
Imperial College (United Kingdom)
Khalifa University of Science and Technology (UAE)

The center has also signed an MOU with SEC, GCCIA and ECRA to develop the future of electricity in the kingdom and optimize electricity trade between GCC and MENA countries.

Gallery

See also

King Faisal Center for Research and Islamic Studies 
 List of think tanks

References

External links
King Abdullah Petroleum Studies and Research Center website 

2013 establishments in Saudi Arabia
Energy research institutes
Petroleum in Saudi Arabia
Research institutes in Saudi Arabia
Science and technology in Saudi Arabia
Scientific organisations based in Saudi Arabia
Zaha Hadid buildings
Think tanks